William Douglas Menzies (28 January 1915 – 23 February 1999) was an Australian rules footballer who played with Footscray in the Victorian Football League (VFL).

He joined Williamstown in June 1939 and played on the wing and was named amongst the best players in 'Town's 1939 premiership win over Brunswick at the MCG before a crowd of 47,098.

Menzies enlisted in the Royal Australian Navy in September 1940 during World War II. He was discharged in March 1945 and returned to play two further games with Williamstown before retiring at the age of 30 with a total of 28 games and 2 goals in the royal blue and gold.

Notes

External links 

1915 births
1999 deaths
Australian rules footballers from Melbourne
Western Bulldogs players
West Footscray Football Club players
Royal Australian Navy personnel of World War II
People from Newport, Victoria
Military personnel from Melbourne